Geigertown is an unincorporated community in Berks County, Pennsylvania.

Geigertown is located within both Union Township and Robeson Township along Hay Creek Road (Former Pennsylvania Route 82) from Geigertown Road to Fire Tower Road.  It is also home to the Geigertown Central Railroad Museum off Geigertown Road.

References

Unincorporated communities in Berks County, Pennsylvania
Unincorporated communities in Pennsylvania